In Greek mythology, Hyrieus was the eponym of Hyria in Boeotia, where he dwelt and where Orion (see below) was born; some sources though place him either in Thrace or on Chios. One source calls him father of Crinacus, father of King Macareus of Lesbos. Most accounts speak of him as a king, although Ovid and Nonnus portray him as a peasant.

Family 
Hyrieus was the son of Alcyone and Poseidon, brother of Hyperenor and Aethusa. By the nymph Clonia, he became the father of Nycteus and Lycus. According to later sources, Hyrieus was also the father of Orion.

Mythology

Treasury 
Hyrieus hired Trophonius and Agamedes to build a treasure chamber for him but they also built a secret entrance to it, so that the treasury was easily accessible by removing just one stone from the outside. Using the secret entrance, they would come and steal some of Hyrieus' possessions. He was dumbfounded at discovering that his fortune was diminishing while the locks and seals remained intact; to catch the thief, he laid a snare. Agamedes was trapped in it; Trophonius cut off his brother's head so that Hyrieus would never know the thief's identity, and himself disappeared in a chasm of the earth.

Orion 
Some speak of Hyrieus as Orion's natural father; others relate that he was childless and a widower and became (technically) adoptive father of Orion via the following circumstances. He was visited by Zeus and Hermes (some add Poseidon), who, to express gratitude for his hospitality, promised him to fulfill a wish of his; he said that he wanted children. The gods filled a sacrificial bull's hide with their urine, then told Hyrieus to bury it. Nine months later, Hyrieus found a newborn baby boy inside and named him Orion; Roman authors thought of the Latin word urina "urine" as an etymon for Orion's name (though actually his name is obviously not of Latin origin). Nonnus, on account of this story, refers to Orion as "having three fathers" and to Gaea (Earth) as his mother.

Other myths 
Hyrieus was said to have expelled Euonymus from the temple of Apollo.

Notes

References 

 Antoninus Liberalis, The Metamorphoses of Antoninus Liberalis translated by Francis Celoria (Routledge 1992). Online version at the Topos Text Project.
 Apollodorus, The Library with an English Translation by Sir James George Frazer, F.B.A., F.R.S. in 2 Volumes, Cambridge, MA, Harvard University Press; London, William Heinemann Ltd. 1921. . Online version at the Perseus Digital Library. Greek text available from the same website.
Gaius Julius Hyginus, Astronomica from The Myths of Hyginus translated and edited by Mary Grant. University of Kansas Publications in Humanistic Studies. Online version at the Topos Text Project.
 Gaius Julius Hyginus, Fabulae from The Myths of Hyginus translated and edited by Mary Grant. University of Kansas Publications in Humanistic Studies. Online version at the Topos Text Project.
 Nonnus of Panopolis, Dionysiaca translated by William Henry Denham Rouse (1863-1950), from the Loeb Classical Library, Cambridge, MA, Harvard University Press, 1940.  Online version at the Topos Text Project.
 Nonnus of Panopolis, Dionysiaca. 3 Vols. W.H.D. Rouse. Cambridge, MA., Harvard University Press; London, William Heinemann, Ltd. 1940–1942. Greek text available at the Perseus Digital Library.
 Pausanias, Description of Greece with an English Translation by W.H.S. Jones, Litt.D., and H.A. Ormerod, M.A., in 4 Volumes. Cambridge, MA, Harvard University Press; London, William Heinemann Ltd. 1918. . Online version at the Perseus Digital Library
 Pausanias, Graeciae Descriptio. 3 vols. Leipzig, Teubner. 1903.  Greek text available at the Perseus Digital Library.
 Publius Ovidius Naso, Fasti translated by James G. Frazer. Online version at the Topos Text Project.
 Publius Ovidius Naso, Fasti. Sir James George Frazer. London; Cambridge, MA. William Heinemann Ltd.; Harvard University Press. 1933. Latin text available at the Perseus Digital Library.
 Strabo, The Geography of Strabo. Edition by H.L. Jones. Cambridge, Mass.: Harvard University Press; London: William Heinemann, Ltd. 1924. Online version at the Perseus Digital Library.
 Strabo, Geographica edited by A. Meineke. Leipzig: Teubner. 1877. Greek text available at the Perseus Digital Library.

Kings in Greek mythology
Children of Poseidon
Demigods in classical mythology
Boeotian characters in Greek mythology
Deeds of Poseidon
Deeds of Zeus